Abhirati (lit. "The Joyous") is the eastern pure land associated with Akshobhya in Mahayana Buddhism. It is described in the Akṣobhyatathāgatasyavyūha Sūtra (Taishō Tripiṭaka, 313), which was first translated into Chinese by Lokakṣema by 186 CE.

Although Abhirati emerged in the earliest era of Mahayana thought, Abhirati is far less widely known than Sukhāvatī, the pure land of Amitābha that has been the sole focus of Pure Land Buddhism since the Tang dynasty.

References

Bibliography
 
 

 
Pure lands